
In basketball, points are the sum of the score accumulated through free throw or field goal. 
While the NCAA's current three-division format has been in place since the 1973–74 season, the organization did not sponsor women's sports until the 1981–82 school year; before that time, women's college sports were governed by the Association of Intercollegiate Athletics for Women (AIAW). The NCAA has officially recorded scoring statistics since it first sponsored women's basketball. Official scoring leaders are based solely on per-game average, not total points. While the NCAA maintains a ranked list of players by total points within each season on its official website, it does not include seasonal leaders in total points in its printed record books.

Unlike for men's basketball, the NCAA does not keep records of the top scorers (by total points) for a single season. Records of the top scorer (by average points per game) for each season and scorers with more than 900 points in a season are however available.

Kelsey Plum currently holds the single-season scoring record for NCAA Division I of 1,109 points, set during her senior season at Washington. She is also the only NCAA Division I women's basketball player who scored more than 900 points in more than one season (2015–16 and 2016–17).

Key

Season scoring leaders (points per game)

Most points in a season (>900 points)

Footnotes

References
General
 

Specific

Scoring, season
Lists of college women's basketball players in the United States